"Say" is a selfwritten song by American pop singer Ryan Cabrera, produced by Daniel James, Leah Haywood for Cabrera's third studio album The Moon Under Water (2008). The track was released as the first single from the album in the first quarter of 2008.

Music video
Its accompanying music video features Cabrera performing the track and walking in the city. The video features a cameo appearance from Rob Dyrdek.

Reception
"Say" received positive responses from some critics, but the single flopped. Chuck Taylor of Billboard magazine described it as "the catchiest, coolest, most immediate release of the year." Allmusic's Stephen Thomas Erlewine referred to the song as a "near-incandescent pop tune almost worthy of Gregg Alexander."

References

External links 
 Ryan Cabrera's Say music video
 Ryan Cabrera's official website

2008 singles
Ryan Cabrera songs
2008 songs
Songs written by Leah Haywood
Songs written by Daniel James (record producer)
Songs written by Ryan Cabrera